W. O. Boston High School was an American public high school in Lake Charles, Louisiana. Named in honor of William Oscar Boston, it opened in 1949 as a segregated school for Blacks. It was renamed from Second Ward Colored School, which had been in the community since the late 19th century. W. O. Boston's first principal was Ralph C. Reynaud. 

In sports, the W. O. Boston Panthers won three state titles in 1972 in boys basketball, girls track and field, and football.

In 1983, the school merged with Lake Charles High School to form Lake Charles-Boston. At the time, W. O. Boston was predominantly Black, while Lake Charles was racially relatively even. The school board supported the merger to eliminate a one-race school. Blacks opposed it, contending that it destroyed Calcasieu Parish's best example of racial balance. The resulting Lake Charles-Boston was 78.2 percent Black and 21.8 percent White. Blacks also disagreed that Barbe High School, which was predominantly White, was largely unaffected by the board's desegregation plan.

Notable alumni
Jim Griffin, football player
David Lawrence, basketball player
Edmund Lawrence, basketball player
Charlie Joiner, football player
Wilbert Rideau, convicted killer and journalist

See also
List of former high schools in Louisiana
List of schools in Lake Charles, Louisiana

References

Historically segregated African-American schools in Louisiana
Public high schools in Louisiana
Schools in Calcasieu Parish, Louisiana